MXV may refer to:
 Mexican unidad de inversión, a currency unit used in Mexico intended to compensate for the effects of inflation
 MxV Rail, a railroad research, training, and testing facility in Pueblo, Colorado, United States
 Mörön Airport, the IATA code MXV